Basilosaurinae is a subfamily of cetaceans archaeocetes containing two genera: Basilosaurus and Basiloterus. They were characterized by elongated distal thoracic vertebrae, lumbar, and proximal sacrococcygeal. All known members of the subfamily are larger than their relatives of the Dorudontinae subfamily except Cynthiacetus.

Classification 
 Subfamily Basilosaurinae
 Genus Basilosaurus
 Basilosaurus cetoides
 Basilosaurus isis
 Genus Basiloterus
 Basiloterus hussaini

Notes

References

 
 

Basilosauridae
Eocene first appearances
Eocene extinctions